"Nice" is the 34th single by British pop band Duran Duran. Released in 2005 to radio in Europe and as download only, it was the third single to be lifted from the group's Astronaut album.

About the song
The infectious pop song was one of the first that the band wrote after its reunion in 2001, but a final version was not recorded until 2004 with producer Don Gilmore at Sphere Studios in London.

David Medsker of PopMatters said:
"If there is a single moment where things fall seamlessly into place on Astronaut, it is "Nice", a magnificent melding of Andy's power chords, Nick's wall of synths, and John's octave-jumping disco bass that recalls the best moments of Rio all rolled into one. It's not particularly complex, but neither was "Hold Back The Rain", a fan favorite to this day. "Nice" is simple in all the right ways and, like all good pop songs, it knows when to quit, with a cold ending at a mere three minutes and 27 seconds. The label is nuts if they don't release this as the second single."

The song, even more energetic live than on recording, was a crowd-pleaser among new and old fans at the band's live shows in 2004 and 2005.

Music video
Gary Oldknow, who created most of the videos for The Devils and on-stage visuals for Duran Duran's concerts since 1998, was commissioned to make a music video for "Nice". As the track was relegated to radio play and download only, with no marketing push, the video got cancelled before it was completed.

B-sides, bonus tracks and remixes
There were no b-sides made for "Nice", but there were a myriad of remixes available via download. These consist of mixes by Eric Prydz, Pablo La Rosa, Mike Greig, Dready and Johnson Somerset.

Track listing

CD for Promotion (Europe only)

Download

Other appearances
Apart from the single, "Nice" has also appeared on:

Albums:
Astronaut (2004)

Personnel
Duran Duran are:
Simon Le Bon – vocals
Nick Rhodes – keyboards
John Taylor – bass guitar
Roger Taylor – drums
Andy Taylor – guitar

Also credited:
Don Gilmore – producer
Duran Duran – producer

References
 Official band site
 Duran Duran Timeline: 2005

2005 singles
Duran Duran songs
Songs written by Simon Le Bon
Songs written by John Taylor (bass guitarist)
Songs written by Roger Taylor (Duran Duran drummer)
Songs written by Andy Taylor (guitarist)
Songs written by Nick Rhodes
2001 songs